The Prince of Pereiaslavl was the kniaz (the ruler or sub-ruler) of the Rus Principality of Pereiaslavl, a lordship based on the city of Pereiaslavl on the Trubezh river and straddling extensive territory to the east in what are now parts of Ukraine. It lay on Rus civilization's southern frontier with the steppe.

The principality emerges was apportioned as the inheritance of Vsevolod I of Kiev(Kyiv, son of Yaroslav the Wise; his brother Sviatoslav received Chernigov, while Smolensk went to Viacheslav and Volodymyr  to Igor; this ladder of succession is related to the seniority order mentioned above. Vsevolod's appanage included the northern lands of Rostov and the lightly colonised north-eastern zone of Rus (see Vladimir-Suzdal).

The Primary Chronicle recorded that in 988 Vladimir had assigned the northern lands (later associated with Pereyaslavl) to Yaroslav. The town was destroyed by the Mongols in March 1239, the first of the great Rus cities to fall. Certainly from the reign of Vsevolod Yaroslavich, the princes of Pereyaslavl held the principality of Rostov-Suzdal, which was heavily colonized by Slavs thereafter, a process which strengthened the region's power and independence, separating the two regions.

In 1132, Yaropolk became Grand Prince on his brother Mstislav's death, while the Monomashichi descended into general internecine conflict over the Pereyaslavl principality. Yaropolk appointed Vsevolod Mstislavich, prince of Novgorod, to the principality of Pereiaslavl - in this era designated heir to the Kievan throne - thus provoking Yaropolk's younger brother Yuri Dolgoruki, controller of Suzdal, into war. Yuri drove out Vsevolod, whom Yaropolk then replaced with Iziaslav. An agreement was reached by 1134 between Yuri and Yaropolk that their common brother Vyacheslav would take the throne of Pereyaslavl.

List of princes of Pereyaslavl
 Yaroslav I the Wise, 988–1010
 Boris Vladimirovich
 Elias Yaroslavich, c. 1019
 —
 Vsevolod I, 1054–1076
 Rostislav I Vsevolodich 1076, d. 1093
 Vladimir I Monomakh, 1076–1078
 Rostislav I Vsevolodich (again), 1078–1093
 Vladimir II Vsevolodich (again), 1094–1113
 Svyatoslav I Vladimirovich, d. 1114
 Yaropolk I, 1114–1132
 Vsevolod II Mstislavich, 1132 x 1134
 Izyaslav I Mstislavich, 1132 x 1134
 Vyacheslav I Vladimirovich, 1132–1134
 Andrey Vladimirovich, 1135–1141
 Vyacheslav I Vladimirovich (again), 1142
 Iziaslav II, 1143–1145
 Mstislav Izyaslavich, 1146–1149
 Rostislav II Yurevich, 1149–1151
 Mstislav Izyaslavich (again), 1151–1155
 Gleb Yurevich, 1155–1169
 Vladimir III Glebovich, appointed 1169, died 1187
 Yaroslav II Mstislavich ??
 Vsevolod III the Big Nest, ?–1206
 Vsevolod IV Svyatoslavich, 1206
 Rurik Rostislavich, 1206–?
 Vladimir IV Rurikovich, 1206–1213

See also
 Vladimir-Suzdal#Grand Princes of Vladimir-Suzdal

Notes

References

External links
 

Noble titles of Kievan Rus
Princes of Pereyaslavl